Tokelau, a dependency of New Zealand with a population of fewer than 1,500, has yet to take part in the Commonwealth Games. Tokelau usually only competes in international sports events in the Pacific region, such as the Pacific Games and Pacific Mini Games.

A team representing Tokelau was expected to make its début at the 2010 Commonwealth Games in Delhi, India, from 3 to 14 October 2010. However no team was present for the Opening Ceremony, and no Tokelauan athletes took part in the Games.

See also
Tokelau at the Pacific Games

References 

Commonwealth Games Associations
Tokelau at the Commonwealth Games
Nations at the Commonwealth Games
National sports teams of Tokelau